Ryan Stock is a Canadian-based TV stunt man from Beaumont, Alberta who has a show on the Discovery Channel called "Guinea Pig". Stock and his fiancée Amber Lynn Walker travel around Canada and the United States and perform stunts involving electrical shocks, automobile crashes and intentional poisoning.  The Guinea pig show is no longer in production but may still air in some countries.
Stock became fascinated with magic at an early age and quickly developed his skills as a magician. He soon moved on from simple tricks to performing feats such as fire-eating and fire-breathing. Stock is also the creator and originator of several sideshow stunts performed around the world, notably his signature piece entitled "The Human MeatHead", created in 2000. This stunt involves forcing a large meat hook into his nose and out his mouth, from which he then hangs weight (up to 70 lbs) from the hook.

The Jim Rose Circus 
Stock was also featured on the 2003 reality series The Jim Rose Twisted Tour, where during an early episode he became a member of the traveling Jim Rose Circus in a staged audition for Jim Rose on the tour bus. He would use the alias Rupert while traveling with the circus.

Stock is also an accomplished sleight of hand artist, showing many of his tricks and illusions along the tour.  He also made a January 11, 2013 appearance on the Tonight Show with Jay Leno by swinging a 15-pound ham from an inserted meat hook through his nose and out his mouth, to the amusement of NBC's Al Roker during a "Meal or No Meal" sketch. In this show a panel of celebrity judges agree to give 3 invited people a free meal at a local restaurant in exchange for a quirky body stunt sketch they can do.

He currently holds 5 Guinness World Records.

Stock pulled a 1696 kg 2002 Audi Quattro 6.38m in 20.53 seconds, while having a sword inserted into his esophagus. Two chains were attached between the vehicle's chassis and the sword's hilt.  Stock currently holds the world record for "Heaviest Vehicle pull by a sword swallower" as of November 26, 2008,as verified by Guinness World Records.

He holds the record for "The heaviest vehicle pulled using a hook through the nasal cavity and out of the mouth", The automobile weighed 725.0 kg (1598.35 lb), and Stock's attempt at the record was televised on the 'Lo Show dei Record' in Rome, Italy, on 21 March 2012.

He previously held the record for "Most drink can tops torn off with the teeth". Stock broke the record on the March third broadcast of "Guinness World Records Gone Wild", tearing through eleven drink cans in just under the sixty second mark, he was compared to "A Beaver with a taste for aluminum" by the show's hosts. This record was beat on June 22, 2020 by professional MMA fighter Chuck "The Energiza" Mady on the Podcast 2 Dudes & a Mike. Chuck was able to tear through 24 cans in 60 seconds.

In 2014 Stock broke two world records in Edmonton, Alberta Canada. He now holds the record for "most blowtorches extinguished on the tongue in one minute." The previous record was 27, Stock extinguished 40.  He also holds the record for "The heaviest weight lifted by hooks in the forearms." and lifted two cement blocks weighing 70 lbs (31.75 kg).

America's Got Talent 
In 2016, Ryan Stock and AmberLynn auditioned for the eleventh season of the NBC reality competition America's Got Talent, and advanced to the live quarterfinals. During their quarterfinal on August 2, 2016, the duo's act was to culminate with a stunt in which AmberLynn was to shoot a flaming arrow down a rod with a target on it, which had been swallowed by Stock. However, a targeting error, attributed to slippage of a laser scope on the crossbow, caused the arrow to misfire and strike Stock's neck. Stock suffered minor injuries from the accident but was otherwise unharmed. The duo was ultimately eliminated from the competition. He subsequently was featured on 2019 AGT "Champions".

References

External links
 

Canadian stunt performers
Living people
Year of birth missing (living people)
America's Got Talent contestants